Ventura José Pérez Mariño (born 29 December 1949) is a Spanish judge and former Spanish Socialist Workers' Party (PSOE) politician. He was a member of the Congress of Deputies from 1993 to 1995, and a city councillor in Vigo from 2003 to 2005, serving as mayor for the first few weeks of his tenure.

Biography
Pérez Mariño was a judge in the Audiencia Nacional. In May 1993, he was voluntarily removed from the judiciary so that he could contest the general election. He was elected as the Spanish Socialist Workers' Party's (PSOE) list leader in Lugo. He and fellow magistrate Baltasar Garzón were persuaded into politics by PSOE prime minister Felipe González in order to give the party a moral image after scandals. Both became fiercely critical of González when it was revealed that his government had been covertly arming the anti-ETA paramilitary GAL in the 1980s. Garzón returned to his court to investigate the matter and in February 1995, Pérez Mariño resigned after publicly calling for González to do the same.

In April 2002, Pérez Mariño returned to the PSOE to be their mayoral candidate in the following year's local elections in his hometown of Vigo. He was endorsed by party leader José Luis Rodríguez Zapatero. While the People's Party (PP) took 10 seats and his party took 8, his party formed a coalition with the Galician Nationalist Bloc (BNG) and he was installed as mayor. In December, following disputes with the BNG leader Lois Pérez Castrillo, he was voted out in a motion of no confidence that made PP leader Corina Porro the new mayor. He quit his council seat and left politics for good in July 2005 for "strictly personal" reasons, returning to the judiciary; his party and the BNG then resumed their pact.

In August 2021, Pérez Mariño was hospitalised after nearly drowning at the beach in Aldán.

References

1949 births
Living people
People from Vigo
20th-century Spanish judges
Spanish Socialist Workers' Party politicians
Members of the 5th Congress of Deputies (Spain)
Mayors of places in Galicia